Qızılca or Kyzyldzha or Kizildzha may refer to:

Azerbaijan
Qızılca, Goygol, Azerbaijan
Qızılca, Lachin, Azerbaijan
Qızılca, Nakhchivan, Azerbaijan

Iran
Kyzyldzha, Ahar, East Azerbaijan Province
Kyzyldzha, Shabestar, East Azerbaijan Province